List of Punjabi films released in the Indian Punjab in the decade 1971–1980.

1980
Fauji Chacha - Sanjeev Kumar, Dheeraj Kumar, Madan Puri & Mehar Mittal (Dir: Dharam Kumar)
Choran Nu Mor - Dheeraj Kumar, Padmini Kapila
Sardara Kartara - Veerendra, Arpana Chaudhry, Yash Sharma, Sudha Chopra, Rajnibala, Mehar Mittal (Dir: Harbux Latta)
Jatti - Mehar Mittal, Arpana Choudhry, Vijay Tandon  (Dir: Mohan Bhakri) REMAKE OF Bhangrha - Nishi, Sunder, Khariti, Vimla, Satish, Ramlal & Majnu Dir: Jugal Kishore, Music: Hansraj Behl
Ishq Nimana - Satish Kaul, Daljit Kaur, Tina Ghai, Ram Mohan, Yash Sharma, Sudha Chopra, Nina Cheema & Mehar Mittal (Dir: Vinod Talwar)
Jai Mata Sheranwali - Yogesh Chabbra, Ruby Singh, Lata Arora, Surjeet Kaur, Jaya Kausalya, Mehar Mittal, Surendra Sharma, Manorama
Gori Dian Jhanjran - Dheeraj Kumar, Satish Kaul, Bhawna Bhatt, Arpana Chaudhry, Seema Kapoor, Motia Kapoor, Manorama, Tuntun, Mehar Mittal(Biswajit-guest app) (Dir: Subhash Bhakri) https://www.flickr.com/photos/gunwan/3861008600/

1979
Jatt Punjabi - Manoj Kumar, Raza Murad, Satish Kaul, Bhawna Bhatt, Arpana Chaudhry, Mehar Mittal, Rajendra Nath, Komila Virk, Madan Puri, Mumtaz Shanti, Yash Sharma, Ram Mohan (Dir: Satish Bakhri) https://www.youtube.com/watch?v=I_AQPGUXwqE
Kuwara Mama - Veerendra, Mehar Mittal, Raj Banta, Bharat Bhushan, Padmini Kapila, Paikrishan, Rajni Bala, Shyamlee, Sunder (Dir: Sukhdev Ahluwalia)
Sukhi Perwaar - Dheeraj Kumar, Mahendera Sandhu, Zaheera, Najneen, Manmohan Krishna (Dir: Dharam Kumar)
Til Til Da lekha - Jayshree T., Sarita, Rakesh Khanna, Manoj Kumar, Kanchan Mattu, Manmohan Krishna (Dir: Sukhdev Ahluwalia)
Guru Manio Granth - Rajesh Behl, Pinchoo Kapoor, Manmohan Krishna, Ram Mohan, D. K. Sapru, Sarita, Joginder Shelly (Dir: S.R. Kapoor)
Dera Aashqan Da - Satish Kaul, Padmini Kapila, Sonia Sahni, Manmohan Krishna, Jaishree T., Meena T. (Dir: Pavan Dev) https://www.flickr.com/photos/gunwan/3867053714/
Gorakh Dhanda - Prem Bedi, Anu Dhawan, Diljit Kaur, Paintal (Dir: Ramesh Bedi)
Saida Jogan - Daljeet Kaur, Veerendra, Satish Kaul, Mehar Mittal, Kanchan Mattu, Sudha Chopra, Muhammad Sadiq (Dir: B. S. Shaad)
Sehti Murad - Dheeraj Kumar, Anil Dhawan, Ritu Kamal,  Reeta Haksar, Yogesh Chhabra, Meher Mittal (Dir: Kailash Bhandari)
Mutiyaar - Satish Kaul, Rita Bhaduri, Gursharan Singh (theatre director), Rajan Haksar, Sudha Chopra, Kanchan Mattu, Ved Goswami, Mehar Mittal (Dir: Surinder Singh)
Mughlani Begum - Preet Kanwal, Vinod, Kulwant Chawla, Pinky, Pritam Dhindsa (Dir: Surjit Singh Sethi)

1978
 Jindri Yaar Di - Veerendra, Sujit Kumar, Padma Khanna, Komila Virk, Mehar Mittal (Dir: Dharam Kumar)
 Vilayati Babu - Amitabh Bachchan, Reena Roy, Mehar Mittal, Reeta Haksar, Ruby Singh, Yogesh Chhabra (Dir: Dharam Kumar)
 Dhyanu Bhagat - Dara Singh, Yogeeta Bali, Satish Kaul, Komila Virk (Dir: Dara Singh)
 Giddha - Veerendra, Komilla Virk, Mala Jaggi, Dharmendra, Daljeet Kaur, Dara Singh, Rama Vij, Sujit Kumar, Mehar Mittal, Rajendra Nath, Jayshree T., Padma Khanna, Keshto Mukherjee, Navin Nischol, Manorama (Dir: B. S. Shaad)
 Jai Mata Sheranwali - Ruby Singh, Yogesh Chhabra, Lata Arora, Mehar Mittal, Sunder (Dir: Sukhdev Ahluwalia)
 Sher Puttar - Dheeraj Kumar, Padma Khanna, Manmohan Krishna, Dev Kumar, Mehar Mittal (Dir: Subhash Bhakri)
 Udeekan - Simi Grewal, Parikshit Sahni, Bharat Kapoor, Sanjeev Kumar, Bindu (Dir: Hari Dutt)
 Laadli - Kiran Kumar, Zaherra, Sudha Malhotra Dara Singh, Bindu  (Dir: Uttam Tulsi)
 Darani Jathani - Dheeraj Kumar, Radha Saluja  (Dir: Shanti S. Kalra)
 Tera Jawab Nahin -

1977
 Saal Solvan Chadya - Zaheera, Devender Khandelwal, Girija Mitra, Makhan Singh, Chaman Puri, Kulwant, Abhimanyu Sharma, Jagat Singh, Sudha Chopra, Tina Katkar, Neelu, Bhupinder Kaur, Manju Bhatia & Rekha in guest appearance (Dir: Surinder Singh)
 Shaheed Kartar Singh Sarabha - (Dir: Pratab Sagar) Mehar Mittal, Rajani Sharma 
 Sat Sri Akal - Sunil Dutt, Shatrughan Sinha, Reena Roy, Parikshit Sahni, Zaheera, Prem Nath (Dir: Chaman Nillay)
 Sassi Punnu - Satish Kaul, Bhavana Bhatt, Vijay Tandon (Dir: Satish Bhakhri)
 Jai Mata Di -  Dara Singh, Narendra Chanchal, Babu Sonu, Sardar Akhter, Master Satyjeet, Master Vishaal, Sardar Akhtar, Mumtaz Begum, Madhumati, Kamini, TunTun, Sajid, Gulshan Bawaa, Mirza Mushauff, Polsan, Saudagar Singh, Jugnu, Special Appearance: Kamaljeet Sona (DIR: Daljit) https://www.youtube.com/watch?v=BTH2nKO7GWw
 Wangar - Baldev Khosla, Vijay Tandon, Meena Rai, Ruby Singh, Madan Puri, Manmohan Krishna, Chaman Puri, Kanchan Mattu, Mehar Mittal (Dir: Prof. Nirula)
 Sarfarosh [The Story of Shaheed Uddham Singh] - Sardul Kwatra, Lyricist: P. S. Narula https://www.youtube.com/watch?v=E804pq4chXY
 Nachdi Jawani - Romesh Sharma, Meena Rai, Sujit Kumar (Dir: Som Haksar)
 Nakhro -   Som Dutt, Meena Rai, Jaggat Singh (Dir: Satpal)

1976
 Lambardarni - Dara Singh, Veerendra, Aruna Irani, Rajni Sharma, Shammi, Asha Parekh, Mehar Mittal, Kuldeep Manak, Surinder Sharma (Dir: Veerinder)
 Naukar Biwi Da - Rani, Harish, Brahamchari, Coca-Cola (Dir: H. S. Kanwal)
 Sardar-e-Azam - Vijay Tandon, Meena Rai, Raza Murad, Sapru
 Dharti Saddi Maa - Dheeraj Kumar (Dir: Surinder Singh)
 Main Papi Tum Bakhshanhaar - Dharmendra, Ashok Chopra, Shama, Yash Sharma, Yogesh Chabra, Ritu Kamal, Rajni Bala, Bharat Bhushan, Mehar Mittal (Dir: Subhash Bhakri)
 Santo Banto - Veerendra, Aruna Irani, Shatrughan Sinha, Dharmendra, Seema Kapoor, Mehar Mittal, Ajit Singh Deol, Manmohan Krishna (Dir: Ajit Singh Deol, brother of Dharmendra)
 Sawa Lakh Se Ek Ladaun - Dara Singh, Komila Wirk, Navin Nischol, Yogita Bali, Rajesh Khanna, Neetu Singh (Guest Appearance), Randhawa, Yash Sharma, Mumtaz Begum, Sunder, Mehar Mittal, Jankidas, Birbal (Dir: Dara Singh)
 Taakra - Varinder, Raza Murad, Sarita, Payal, Vijay Tandon, Mumtaz Shanti, Mehar Mittal (Dir: Sukhdev Ahluwalia)
 Yamla Jatt - I. S. Johar, Helen (Dir: Om Bedi)
 Daaj - Daljeet Kaur, Dheeraj Kumar, Mehar Mittal, Jeevan, Madan Puri, Darshan Bagga, Jagmohan kaur, Nasir Hussain, Mumtaz Begum (Dir: Dharam Kumar)
 Papi Tarey Anek - Dheeraj Kumar, Mina Rai, Jaishree T., Manmohan Krishna, Om Prakash (Dir: Dharam Kumar)
 Chadi Jawani Budhe Nu - B. S. Sood, Kimti Anand, Rajendranath, Vasundhara, Katy Mirza (produced by F. C. Mehra and directed by A. Salam)
 Change Mande Tere Bande - Birbal, Manmohan Krishna, Mehar Mittal, Raminder Soniya Sahni (Dir: Subhash Bhakri)

1975
 Daku Shamsher Singh - Dev Kumar, Ranjeet, Sarita (Dir: Pushp Raaj)
 Dharam Jeet - Aruna Irani, Veerendra, Raza Murad, Tuntun, Mahendra Sandhu, Meher Mittal, Sunder, Brahmachari (Dir: Sukhdev Ahluwalia)
 Morni - Satish Kaul, Radha Saluja, Rajnibala, Jayashree T., Rajendranath, Jeevan, Madan Puri, Ram Mohan, Gopal Saigal. Tuntun, Mehar Mittal, Khraiti https://www.youtube.com/watch?v=iUjhY1w4DzI (Dir: Jugal Kishore)

1974
 Teri Meri Ik Jindri - Veerendra, Meena Rai, Dharmendra, Vijay Tandon, Rajendra Kumar, Mehar Mittal, Mehmood Jr.
 Sacha Mera Roop Hai - Sarita, Harinder, Manmohan Krishna, Mehar Mittal, Helen, Jeevan, Vijay Tandon, Rajendra Nath, Ranjit, Tun Tun
 Satguru Teri Oat - Dara Singh,Som Dutt (Dir: Kaka Sharma) music by Jagjit Kaur
 Bhagat Dhanna Jatt - Dara Singh, Feroz Khan, Yogita Bali (Dir: Dara Singh)
 Dukh Bhanjan Tera Naam - Shaminder Singh, Radha Saluja, (Guest App by Rajendra Kumar and Dharmendra), Dara Singh, Sunil Dutt, Manmohan Krishna, Johnny Walker, Om Prakash, D. K. Sapru
 Do Sher - Dharmendra, Rajendra Kumar, Gauri Verma, Narendra, Hiralal, Uma Khosla, Dhanraj, Mehar Mittal, Gulab Singh, Surender Shrama, Kanchan, Sujit, Billa, Kidar Sehgal, Gurmeet, Rajan Haskar,(Dir: Sukhdev Ahluwalia)
 Mittar Pyare Nu - Mina Rai, Manmohan Krishna, Vijay Tandon (Dir: B. S. Shaad)
 Shaheed-e-Azam Sardar Bhagat Singh - Rajni Bala, Som Dutt, Achala Sachdev, Dara Singh (Dir: Om Bedi)

1973
 Man Jeete Jag Jeet - Sunil Dutt, Radha Saluja, Gursharan Singh (theatre director),Harbhajan Jabbal, Sona, Ranjeet (Dir: B.S. Thapa)
 Tere Rang Nyare - Som Dutt, Meena Rai, Yash Stharma, Renu, Mehar Mittal, Paintal, Ram Mohan, Navin Nischol, Deven Verma, Satish Chabra (Dir: Pushp)
 Sherni - Subhash Ghai, Radha saluja, Aruna Irani, Ravindra Kapoor, Premnath, Tun tun, Mehar Mittal, Sunder, Gopal Saigal (music by Usha Khanna)
 Patola - V. Gopal, B. N. Bali, Indira Billi, Madan Puri, Sunder, Jani Babu Qawwal, Johnny Whisky, Music: B. N. Bali (Dir: Harish Rana) https://www.youtube.com/watch?v=5rgHhsfuhPs

1972

 Jeeto - Savita, Pravesh Nanda, Uma Khosla, Machhar, Kharaiti (Dir: Ramesh Bedi)
 Mele Mitran De - Dara Singh, Prithviraj Kapoor, Meena Rai, Tun Tun, King Kong (Dir: Chaman Lal Shugal)

1971
 Maa Da Laadla - Mehar Mittal, Vijay Tandon, Meena Rai, Khairati, Majnu

See also
List of Indian Punjabi films after 2011
List of Indian Punjabi films between 2001 and 2010
List of Indian Punjabi films between 1991 and 2000
List of Indian Punjabi films between 1981 and 1990
List of Indian Punjabi films before 1970
 List of Pakistani films

References 

Cinema of Punjab
Punjabi 1971
Punj